Harold John Avery Russell (January 14, 1914 – January 29, 2002) was an American World War II veteran and actor. After losing his hands during his military service, Russell was cast in the epic drama film The Best Years of Our Lives (1946), which earned him an Academy Award for Best Supporting Actor and an honorary Oscar for being an inspiration to returning veterans, making him the first and only actor ever to win two Oscars for the same role and the first non-professional actor to win an Academy Award for acting. He later became the first Oscar recipient to sell his award.

Early life

Harold Russell was born in North Sydney, Nova Scotia, Canada, and moved to Massachusetts, United States, with his family in 1921, after his father's death in 1920.

At the time of the December 7, 1941 attack on Pearl Harbor, he was living in Cambridge, Massachusetts, working at a food market. In his 1949 autobiography, Victory In My Hands, he wrote that he rushed to enlist in the United States Army because he considered himself a failure.

On June 6, 1944, while he was an Army instructor teaching demolition work with the U.S. 13th Airborne Division at Camp Mackall, North Carolina, a defective fuse detonated TNT explosives that he was handling. He lost both hands and was given two hooks to serve as hands. After his recovery, while attending Boston University, Russell was featured in Diary of a Sergeant, an Army film about rehabilitating war veterans.

The Best Years of Our Lives
When film director William Wyler saw the film on Russell, he cast him in The Best Years of Our Lives with Fredric March and Dana Andrews. Russell played the role of Homer Parrish, a United States Navy sailor who lost both hands during the war.

For his role as Parrish, Russell won the Academy Award for Best Supporting Actor in 1947. Earlier in the ceremony, he was awarded an honorary Oscar for ''bringing aid and comfort to disabled veterans through the medium of motion pictures.'' The special award had been created because the board of governors wanted to salute Russell, a non-professional actor, but assumed that he had little chance for a competitive win. It was the only time in Oscar history that the academy awarded two Oscars for the same performance.

Wyler called it "the finest performance I have ever seen on the screen.'' However, Russell earned less than $10,000 for his performance (equivalent to between $150,000 and $160,000 in 2023 dollars), and he did not receive any residual profits.

Later years

Upon completion of the film, Russell returned to Boston University and graduated with a business degree in 1949. 

Russell became active in AMVETS, serving three terms as National Commander. He was first elected in 1949. He was elected to his third term in 1960. He also was vice-president of the World Veterans Fund, Inc., the fundraising branch of the World Veterans Federation.

As head of AMVETS, Russell wrote to President Truman in 1951 supporting his decision to dismiss General Douglas MacArthur during the Korean War. Russell's telegram to Truman cited MacArthur's "repeated insubordination in violation of basic American principles governing civil versus military authority." His telegram asserted that those were "obvious grounds" to relieve MacArthur. Erle Cocke, Jr., commander of the American Legion, said that he was "shocked by the news" that AMVETS and the American Veterans Committee supported MacArthur's firing.

From the early 1960s to the late 1980s, Russell served as chairman of the President's Commission on Employment of the Handicapped, an unpaid position. 

In 1965, Russell received the Golden Plate Award of the American Academy of Achievement.

Russell appeared in two films after his debut, Inside Moves in 1980 and Dogtown in 1997. He also appeared in an episode of Trapper John, M.D., in 1981 and a two-part episode of the television series China Beach in 1989.

Russell authored two autobiographies, Victory in My Hands (1949) and The Best Years of My Life (1981). 

In 1992, Russell consigned his Oscar for Best Supporting Actor to Herman Darvick Autograph Auctions, and, on August 6, 1992, in New York City, the Oscar sold to a private collector for $60,500. Russell defended his action by saying that he needed money for his wife's medical expenses, though this was later disputed. Russell did not sell the special Oscar. After his death, the unidentified collector was identified as Lew Wasserman, a studio executive and talent agent, who then donated it back to the Academy.

On January 29, 2002, Russell died at a nursing home in Needham, Massachusetts and subsequently interred in Lakeview Cemetery in the nearby town of Wayland.

Filmography

References

External links

1914 births
2002 deaths
American male film actors
Best Supporting Actor Academy Award winners
Academy Honorary Award recipients
United States Army personnel of World War II
Canadian emigrants to the United States
Canadian people of Scottish descent
Canadian male film actors
Canadian male television actors
People from North Sydney, Nova Scotia
American amputees
Canadian amputees
Boston University alumni
United States Army soldiers
20th-century American male actors
People without hands
Articles containing video clips
Amputee actors